Rutka may refer to:
the Rutka (river) in Russia
Rutka, Hajnówka County in Podlaskie Voivodeship (north-east Poland)
Rutka, Suwałki County in Podlaskie Voivodeship (north-east Poland)
Rutka, Warmian-Masurian Voivodeship (north Poland)